HMS Abercrombie  was a First World War Royal Navy  monitor.

Background and construction
On 3 November 1914, Charles M. Schwab of Bethlehem Steel offered Winston Churchill, then First Lord of the Admiralty, the use of four /45cal BL MK II twin gun turrets, originally destined for the Greek battleship . These turrets could not be delivered to the German builders, due to the British naval blockade. The Royal Navy immediately designed a class of monitors, designed for shore bombardment, to use the turrets.

The ship was initially named Admiral Farragut in honour of the United States Admiral David Farragut, and reflecting the origin of the guns. She was laid down at the Harland and Wolff shipyard in Belfast on 12 December 1914. Farragut and General Grant were built together on the No 2 building berth, which had been constructed to build . The No 2 & 3 berths were beneath the Arrol Gantry, a large truss girder construction supporting modern electric cranes above the building slip. The monitors were extremely broad over their torpedo bulges, and needed a building berth of this size, but were so short that both could fit into one. Faragut was launched first, on 15 April 1915. Both monitors were built to a high level of completion before launching, with nearly all machinery in place except for the turret. As this required a heavyweight lift, beyond the capacity of a civilian yard, the turrets for both monitors were fitted at the COW yard on the Clyde. As the United States was still neutral, the ship was hurriedly renamed HMS M1 on 31 May 1915. She was then named HMS General Abercrombie on 19 June 1915 and renamed HMS Abercrombie on 21 June 1915.

Service history
Abercrombie sailed for the Dardanelles on 24 June 1915, and provided fire support during the Battle of Gallipoli. She remained in the Eastern Mediterranean and the Aegean, until returning to England in February 1919. She was decommissioned in May 1919 and was disarmed in June 1920. Sold for breaking up in May 1921, she was retained in reserve until resold on 25 June 1927 to the Thos. W. Ward shipyard at Inverkeithing for scrapping.

Citations

References
 
 Dittmar, F. J. & Colledge, J. J., "British Warships 1914-1919", (Ian Allan, London, 1972), 
 Gray, Randal (ed), "Conway's All the World's Fighting Ships 1906–1921", (Conway Maritime Press, London, 1985), 

 

Abercrombie-class monitors
Ships built in Belfast
1915 ships
World War I monitors of the United Kingdom
Ships built by Harland and Wolff